The Departmental Council of Territoire de Belfort is the deliberative assembly of the Territoire de Belfort department in the region of Bourgogne-Franche-Comté. It consists of 18 members (general councilors) from 9 cantons.

The President of the General Council is Florian Bouquet.

Elected members

President

Vice-Presidents 
The President of the Departmental Council is assisted by 5 vice-presidents chosen from among the departmental advisers. Each of them has a delegation of authority.

See also 

 Territoire de Belfort
 General councils of France

References

External links 
 Departmental Council of Territoire de Belfort (official website)

Territoire_de_Belfort
Bourgogne-Franche-Comté